The Futsal European Federation (FEF) is the futsal governing body for both fully and non-independent states or regions in Europe. It was founded in 2017 to replace UEFS. FEF organizes men's and women's tournaments for both national/regional and club teams in Europe.

Members

External links 
FEF

References

Futsal organizations
Futsal
Futsal in Europe